The Sony Zeiss Planar T* FE 50mm F1.4 ZA is a large-aperture, standard full-frame prime lens for the Sony E-mount. It was released by Sony in July 2016.

Though designed for Sony's full frame E-mount cameras, the lens can be used on Sony's APS-C E-mount camera bodies, with an equivalent full-frame field-of-view of 75 mm.

This lens has an external aperture ring.

See also
List of Sony E-mount lenses
Samyang Optics / Rokinon AF 50 mm f/1.4 FE
Sigma 50mm f/1.4 DG HSM Art
Zeiss Planar

References

Camera lenses introduced in 2016
50
50